Es Así (It is So) is the ninth studio album released by Ricardo Montaner. It is his first album to be released under WEA Latina. The self-titled track became his first number one song on the Latin Pop Airplay chart. "La Mujer de Mi Vida" was featured as the theme song for the 1998 Venezuelan telenovela of the same name. "Para Lloar" was one of the recipients of the 1999 ASCAP Latin Awards on the Pop/Ballad category.

Track listing

Charts

Sales and certifications

References

1997 albums
Ricardo Montaner albums
Spanish-language albums
Warner Music Latina albums